Ilara-Mokin is an Ekiti town located in a central part of Ifedore local government of Ondo State. Ilara-Mokin is about 12 km from Ondo state capital, and has Ipogun, Ipinsa, Ikota, Ibule-Soro and Ero as neighbouring towns.

History

According to oral history, the first Alara, or King, of Ilara Mokin was Obalufon Modulua Olutipin, who is said to be the same person as Obalufon Ogbogbodirin or Obalufon Alayemore, rulers of Ife between the 14th and 16th centuries whom established many different settlements before returning to Ile-Ife to rule. They were direct descendants of the semi-legendary Yoruba founder Oduduwa. Among those settlements was what is now known as the town of Ilara-Mokin. After being deposed from the throne by Oranmiyan, he led his family and supporters from Ile-Ife, to a site in modern-day Ekiti or Ondo region, and placed his son Ayajo on the throne before returning to Ile-Ife. The people, known as the Ará people (a Yorùbá) word meaning relative, or family, migrated for several centuries in the region until they arrived at a permanent location for safety and resources in the 1840s-1850s as civil wars plagued Yorubaland, which is their present location.

The name Ilara-Mokin comes from the contraction of the phrase, "ì ní ará  mọ ọ̀kín" (in the native Èkìtì dialect, "ù  ní ará mọ ọ̀kín), meaning "The people who have many relatives and are as honorable as the royal bird. The word ọ̀kín, now attributed to the peacock in modern days, originally referred pure white bird known for its beautiful feathers, and said to represent royalty and prestige. It is often called "Ọba Ẹyẹ," "King of the Birds." The phrase was later contracted to " Ìlárá-Mọ̀kín," or "Ùlárá-Mọ̀kín."
The people of Ilara migrated to their present location in the early 19th century after a series of wars with towns such as Ile-Oluji. As a town in the Ekiti region, they were also influenced by Benin Kingdom. During the Kiriji War, Ilara served as the headquarters for the spy unit of the Ekiti-Parapo army.

The town consists of 5 historical sections that arose from the migration of different groups to the present location. Each of the groups are led by one or a series of chiefs. The oldest sections are the Òkè-Òde and Odò-Ùgbẹ̀yìn. 
The first one, Okè-Òde. The six-highest ranking chieftains of the town, known as the Iarefa, come from this town. The families that produce these chieftains are called Iare, they serve as the members of council of kingmakers who decide the King as well as the priests who uphold the rituals of the Yoruba religion and the worship of the orisha. The second and third in command chiefs of the town, the Lísà and Ọbaálá, are the leaders of this section. Other chiefs from this section include the Arálọyìn, Ọṣíndílẹ̀, and Sẹ́lẹmọ̀. 
The second one, Odò-Ùgbẹyìn, are the oldest section of the town, and include members of the royal family. As such, the Alárá, or king of the town comes from this unit. The leading chief of the section is the Ọ̀ṣọgbọ́n. 
The others are the Ùró (Okè-Ìró), which is led by the chief Sáo, the Oke-Awo (or Ao), of which the chiefs Aláwo/Aláo and Ojumu lead, and the Ùdọ̀fin (Ọ̀dọ̀fin), of which the chief Ọ̀dọ̀fin is the leader. Ọ̀dọ̀fin is also regarded as an Iare chief.

Culture
The people of Ilara Mokin celebrate many holidays. The first one is Mokin Day, which takes place in the month of November. Next is "Ọdun Ìjẹṣu" which translates as Holiday of Eating Yam, which celebrates a successful harvest.

This is celebrated in the first week of September. It is referred as "Ìjẹṣu" because the major crop grown as sold are Yams (uṣu), and it is also a staple food. During the Ijesu period, many rituals are done such as Obèrèmóyè, which consists of a whipping contest, and apoporo, a drumming and dance performed during the night.

Another festival is known as Àjàlémògún in honor of the deity Àjàlémògún, the main orisa of Ilara-Mokin which has played a central role in the legendary history of the town. The festival, which is no longer done, consisted of carrying a large figurine representing the deity from the forest to the market in the center of the town. Many rituals, which are now frowned upon, are said to be appeasing the deity and bring peace, joy, and prosperity to the land.

Many people from Ilara still practice the traditional Yoruba religion, and thus have the Ògún festival in September, and also have a festival devoted to Oshun in July.

Language
The people of Ilara-Mokin speak the Ekiti dialect of Yoruba, most similar to the language of Akure, and Igbara-oke, and some closeness to the Ado-Ekiti dialect.

Administration

Ilara-Mokin is ruled by the Alara (king). The current king is Oba Abiodun Aderemi Adefehinti, Agbekorun II, who has been ruling since 17 July 1998, after succeeding Alara Oba Solomon Ojopagogo Afinbiokin, Adeyeye II. Surrounding him is a cabinet a chiefs (Olóyè), known as Ìàrẹ. The highest six of these Ìàrẹ are known as the Ìàrẹfà (Iwarefa). While the monarchy and royal family come from the Odo-Ugbeyin quarter of Ilara-Mokin, most of the chiefs and custodians of tradition are from the Oke-Ode section.

There are also chiefs that represent the hunters, farmers, and blacksmiths.

Geography
Ilara Mokin is a fertile rich grassland and forest. It is surrounded to the north by the towns of Igbara Oke and Ero. To the south includes the towns of Isarun, Ikota, Ibule Soro, and a few miles, the Ondo State capital Akure.

Education

Primary and secondary education
St. Michael Primary School
The Apostolic High School
Muslim Primary School
Muslim Comprehensive High School
St. Andrew's Primary School 
St. Joseph's Primary School
The Apostolic Primary School

Universities and colleges
Public Service Training Institute
Elizade University

Media

Radio
Adaba FM

Notable people
 

 Michael Ade-Ojo, (b. 1938) businessman, founder of Elizade University
 Wahab Adegbenro, (1955 - 2020) Nigerian Physician and Ondo State Commissioner of Health
 Dele Ojo, (1938 – 2018) Nigerian musician and performer, who was a prominent musician in the Juju genre of music.

Photo gallery of Ilara Mokin

References

External links
Ilara – welcome to ilara mokin
Home | Elizade University

Towns in Nigeria